PS Duchess of Albany was a passenger vessel built for the London and South Western Railway and London, Brighton and South Coast Railway in 1889.

History

The ship was built by Scotts of Greenock and launched on 7 November 1889.  She was constructed for a joint venture between the London and South Western Railway and the London, Brighton and South Coast Railway for the passenger trade to the Isle of Wight.

Occasionally she also undertook excursion runs, for example on 28 June 1890 there was an advertised trip from Portsmouth, Southsea and Ryde to Bournemouth. The fare was 2s 6d (equivalent to £ in ) (excluding Pier Tolls).

In 1923 she passed to the Southern Railway and was scrapped in 1928.

References

1889 ships
Steamships of the United Kingdom
Paddle steamers of the United Kingdom
Ships built on the River Clyde
Ships of the London and South Western Railway
Ships of the London, Brighton and South Coast Railway
Ships of the Southern Railway (UK)